Fenerbahçe Spor Kulübü (meaning Fenerbahçe Sports Club), commonly known as Fenerbahçe or simply Fener, is a major Turkish professional multi-sport club based in the Kadıköy district of Istanbul, Turkey. Fenerbahçe is parent to a number of different competitive departments including football, basketball, volleyball, table tennis, athletics, swimming, sailing, boxing, rowing, and eSports, which have won numerous European and domestic titles over the club's history.

Fenerbahçe is one of the oldest and most successful multi-sport clubs in Turkey, having won as much as 12 international titles, including 8 major European titles, 1 World Championship and 4 regional Balkan titles in five sports (Football, Basketball, Volleyball, Table Tennis, Tennis). They have won European titles with four of their sports departments (Fenerbahçe Men's Basketball, Fenerbahçe Men's Volleyball, Fenerbahçe Women's Volleyball, Fenerbahçe Women's Table Tennis), being one of two sports clubs in Turkey and one of a few in Europe to have achieved this rare feat.

The men's football department is the most notable one of the club and has won a total of 64 domestic trophies, including a record 28 Turkish championship titles (19 Turkish Super League, 6 National Division, and 3 Turkish Football Championship titles), among others. The club is also leading the all-time table of the Turkish Super League. In international club football, Fenerbahçe have won the Balkans Cup in 1968, the first international trophy won by a Turkish football team.

The men's basketball team is one of the most successful in Turkey and is  the first team in Turkish basketball history to have won the EuroLeague. They became European champions in the 2016–17 season and runners-up in 2015–16 and 2017–18. The club have played in five consecutive EuroLeague Final Fours (2015, 2016, 2017, 2018, 2019) so far, which is also a Turkish record.

In volleyball, Fenerbahçe became the first Turkish club ever to be crowned World champions in an Olympic team sport, by winning the FIVB Volleyball Women's Club World Championship undefeated in 2010. They also were crowned European Champions by winning the CEV Champions League in the 2011–12 season, having reached the final before in 2010. Furthermore, they won the CEV Cup in 2014. The men's volleyball team won the CEV Challenge Cup, also in the 2013–14 season, thus writing volleyball history as the women's team won another continental title, the aforementioned CEV Cup, the very same day. By achieving this unparalleled feat, Fenerbahçe became the only sports club in Turkey and one of few in Europe with European titles won in both the men's and women's volleyball departments. They also became Balkan Champions in 2009 and 2013.

The table tennis department of Fenerbahçe is the best in Turkey and one of the best in Europe, with the women's team having won the ETTU Cup two times in a row, in the 2011–12 and 2012–13 seasons, which is a Turkish record. They became the only Turkish team that played in a European Champions League Final, and they won the Champions League title in 2015 undefeated, thus achieving the only Triple Crown ever for a Turkish table tennis team. The men's team reached the final of the ETTU Cup in 2008, which is the best result for any Turkish team to date.

The former tennis team won the Balkan Championship in 1932.

Fenerbahçe is one of the most supported Turkish clubs with millions of fans inside Turkey and millions of others in the Turkish diaspora all over the world
 
The club has 309,026 paid members as of 16 September 2012.

History

Foundation and early history

Fenerbahçe was founded as a football club in 1907 in Istanbul, Ottoman Empire, by Ziya Songülen (then Nurizade Ziya Bey), Ayetullah Bey and Necip Okaner (then Enver Necip Bey). This group of individuals founded the club secretly in order to keep a low profile and not get into any trouble with the strict Ottoman rule. So strict that the Sultan, Abdul Hamid II, forbade the Turkish youth to set up a club or engage in the game of football played by the English families that was watched in envy. The club's name comes from Fenerbahçe, a neighbourhood in Istanbul. The name literally means "lighthouse garden" in Turkish (from fener, meaning "lighthouse", and bahçe, meaning "garden"), referring to a historic lighthouse located at Fenerbahçe Cape.

Ziya Songülen was elected the first President of the club, Ayetullah Bey became the first General Secretary, and Enver Necip Okaner was given the post of the General Captain. The lighthouse situated on the Fenerbahçe Cape was a big influence on the design of the club's first crest, which sported the yellow and white colors of daffodils around the lighthouse. The kits were also designed with yellow and white stripes. The crest and the colors of the club were changed in 1910 when Hikmet Topuzer redesigned the badge and Ziya Songülen changed the colors to yellow and navy, from then on the iconic colors of the club. Fenerbahçe's activities were kept in secrecy until a legislation reform in 1908, when, under a new law, all football clubs had to register to exist legally.

Fenerbahçe joined the Istanbul League in 1909, finishing fifth in their first year. The founding line-up included Ziya Songülen, Ayetullah Bey, Necip Okaner, Galip Kulaksızoğlu, Hassan Sami Kocamemi, Asaf Beşpınar, Enver Yetiker, Şevkati Hulusi Bey, Fuat Hüsnü Kayacan, Hamit Hüsnü Kayacan, and Nasuhi Baydar. Fenerbahçe played against the staff of the Royal Navy that occupied Istanbul during the Turkish War of Independence. Some British soldiers formed football teams that were named after the players' speciality, for example Essex Engineers, Irish Guards, Grenadiers, and Artillery. These teams played against each other and against local football teams in Istanbul. Fenerbahçe won many of these matches.

The Turkish Football Federation founded a professional nationwide league in 1959, which continues today under the name of the Süper Lig. Fenerbahçe won the first tournament, beating Galatasaray 4–1 on aggregate. The next year, Fenerbahçe participated in the UEFA European Cup for the first time. They qualified through a 4–3 win over Csepel SC. They lost their first-round game to OGC Nice 1–5 in a playoff game after drawing on aggregate. They were also runners-up three times.

In the 1966–67 Balkans Cup (a competition set up for Eastern European clubs from Albania, Bulgaria, Greece, Romania, Turkey, and Yugoslavia that existed between the 1960–61 and 1993–94 seasons), Fenerbahçe won the cup after three matches against Greek club AEK Athens, making them the first Turkish club to win a non-domestic competition. This success would remain unparalleled by a Turkish club until Sarıyer and Samsunspor won the cup many years later in the 1990s, when the competition lost much of its original popularity.

Later years
The 1970s saw Fenerbahçe win four more league titles. Fenerbahçe won three titles in the 1980s, while the rivals Galatasaray and Beşiktaş dominated the Turkish League during the 1990s, combining to win nine out of 10 league titles. Fenerbahçe's only Turkish League success during the 1990s came in the 1995–1996 season under Carlos Alberto Parreira. Fenerbahçe won the league title in 2001, denying Galatasaray a fifth consecutive title. They followed up the next season with a runners-up place behind Galatasaray with new coach Werner Lorant.

The next season, however, did not go so well as Fenerbahçe finished in sixth place with Ariel Ortega in the squad. Despite this, that season is memorable to many Fenerbahçe fans due to a historical 6–0 win against archrivals Galatasaray in Şükrü Saracoğlu Stadium on 6 November 2002. After firing Werner Lorant, they hired another German coach, Christoph Daum. Daum had previously coached in Turkey, winning the league with Beşiktaş in 1994–95. Fenerbahçe brought in players including Pierre van Hooijdonk, Mehmet Aurélio, and Fabio Luciano as a rebuilding process. These new players lead Fenerbahçe to their fifteenth title and third star (one being awarded for every five league titles won by a club).

The next year was followed up by a narrow championship over Trabzonspor, winning the then record of sixteen Turkish First Football League championships. Fenerbahçe lost the title in the last week of the 2005–06 season to Galatasaray. Fenerbahçe needed a win, but instead drew 1–1 with Denizlispor while Galatasaray won 3–0 over Kayserispor. Soon after, Christoph Daum stepped down as manager, and was replaced by Zico on 4 July 2006. Zico began his reign by signing two new defenders, highly touted Uruguayan international Diego Lugano, and fellow Brazilian Edu Dracena. Zico also signed two strikers, Serbian international Mateja Kežman, and another Brazilian, Deivid.

Fenerbahçe's 2006–07 domestic season started off with a 6–0 win over relegation candidates Kayseri Erciyesspor. In the 32nd week of the Süper Lig, Fenerbahçe drew Trabzonspor 2–2, while Beşiktaş lost to Bursaspor 0–3, putting the former out of contention for the title. Fenerbahçe won their seventeenth Süper Lig title in 2006–07, the most in Turkey.

2007–2016
On 11 January 2007, Fenerbahçe were officially invited to G-14. G-14 was an association which consists of top European clubs. Fenerbahçe are the only Turkish club that have been invited to this association. In March 2008, Fenerbahçe's record application was accepted by Guinness World Records Management, which envisages Fenerbahçe to have the highest number of medal and trophy achievements on the planet with its 9 departments entirely, a total of 1134 cups and medals.
In the 1996–97 season of the UEFA Champions League Fenerbahçe completed the group stage with seven points and, among others, beat Manchester United 1–0 in Old Trafford undoing the record of the English giants being unbeaten for 40 years in their homeground. Under Zico's command, Fenerbahçe qualified from the UEFA Champions League 2007–08 group stage for the first time in the club's history and went on to beat Sevilla to become a quarter-finalist in the 2007–08 season. So far, Zico is also the most successful manager of the team's history in the European arena.
After successful scores both in local league of Turkey and international matches, Zico gained a new nickname from Fenerbahçe fans: Kral Arthur (meaning "King Arthur" in Turkish). Since 2000, Fenerbahçe improved the club's finances and facilities, bringing world stars to the club such as Haim Revivo, Ariel Ortega, Serhii Rebrov, Pierre van Hooijdonk, Alex de Souza, Stephen Appiah, Nicolas Anelka and lately Mateja Kežman, Roberto Carlos, and Dani Güiza.
Fenerbahçe's 2009–10 season ended in shock as they lost the title on the last day. The Fenerbahçe players were told a draw would be enough towards the end of the match only to find out that other games went against their favour as Bursaspor beat Beşiktaş 2–1 to get the title. Despite the title loss, Fenerbahçe ended the season with the highest number of clean sheets (10), as well as the joint longest winning streak (8). In July 2011, Fenerbahçe fans invaded the pitch during a friendly against the Ukrainian champions Shakhtar Donetsk. As punishment, Fenerbahçe was sentenced to two Turkish league games in empty stadia. The TFF later allowed those two games to be filled with spectators; the men were barred while women and children under twelve were admitted for free. On 29 October 2012, Antalyaspor ends Fenerbahçe's 47-match unbeaten run in the Süper Lig at Şükrü Saracoğlu Stadium in Kadıköy had to come to an end some day with score 1–3. Fenerbahçe had not lost a single match at home in Kadıköy ever since they were beaten 2–3 by eventual champion Bursaspor in week 22, on 22 February 2010. Fenerbahçe won 38 and drew nine in the 47 matches they played within 980 days since 22 February 2010. On 3 November 2012, Fenerbahçe peck Akhisar Belediyespor to break 181-day away jinx. On 2 May 2013, Fenerbahçe was eliminated by Benfica with an aggregate score of 3–2 in the 2012–13 Europa League semi-finals, and is considered to be the greatest success in Fenerbahçe's history to make it to the semi-finals in UEFA competitions.
On 28 June 2013, Ersun Yanal has agreed to take charge of Fenerbahçe, replacing Aykut Kocaman who resigned at the end of May, the club said on Friday. Ersun Yanal's appointment coincides with tough times for Fenerbahçe, who have been banned from European competition for two seasons over their involvement in a domestic sports corruption scandal. Fenerbahçe, who finished second in the Süper Lig last season, will miss out on next season's Champions League which they had been due to enter in the third qualifying round.

In 2016 the club has once again entered Europe wide competition, as it is engaged in the UEFA Europa League competition.

Club crest and colours

Since the club's foundation, Fenerbahçe has used the same badge, which has only undergone minor alterations.

It was designed by Hikmet Topuzer, nicknamed Topuz Hikmet, who played as left winger, in 1910, and had made as lapel pins by Tevfik Haccar Taşçı (then Tevfik Haccar) in London. The crest consists of five colours. The white section which includes the writing Fenerbahçe Spor Kulübü ★ 1907 ★ represents purity and open-heartedness, the red section represents love and attachment to the club and symbolises the Turkish flag. The yellow section symbolises other ones' envy and jealousy about Fenerbahçe, while the navy symbolises nobility. The oak leaf which rises from the navy and yellow section shows the force and the power of being a member of Fenerbahçe. The green colour of the leaf shows the success of Fenerbahçe is imperative.
Hikmet Topuzer describes the story of the emblem as below:

European and worldwide honours

Active departments

Fenerbahçe Football 

The club were founded as a football club in 1907, hence the men's football department are the first and oldest of the club. They have won a record 28 Turkish championship titles over the course of their history, including 19 Super League titles, 6 National Division titles, and 3 former Turkish Football Championship titles. Fenerbahçe have also won the Balkans Cup in 1968, which is marked as the first ever international trophy won by a Turkish football club.

National Championships – 28 (record)
 Turkish Football Championship/Turkish National Division/Turkish Super League
Winners (28) (record):1933, 1935, 1937, 1940, 1943, 1944, 1945, 1946, 1950, 1959, 1960–61, 1963–64, 1964–65, 1967–68, 1969–70, 1973–74, 1974–75, 1977–78, 1982–83, 1984–85, 1988–89, 1995–96, 2000–01, 2003–04, 2004–05, 2006–07, 2010–11, 2013–14
National Cups – 25
 Turkish Super Cup
 Winners (9): 1968, 1973, 1975, 1984, 1985, 1990, 2007, 2009, 2014
 Prime Minister's Cup
 Winners (8) (record): 1945, 1946, 1950, 1973, 1980, 1989, 1993, 1998
 Turkish Cup
 Winners (6): 1967–68, 1973–74, 1978–79, 1982–83, 2011–12, 2012–13
 Atatürk Cup
 Winners (1) (shared-record): 1998
 Spor Toto Cup
 Winners (1): 1966–67

European competitions – 1
 Balkans Cup
 Winners (1): 1966–67

Fenerbahçe Women's Football 
Founded in 2021.

Fenerbahçe Men's Basketball 

Initially founded in 1913, the men's basketball department could not persist due to the Balkan Wars and WWI. Eventually, under the initiative of Muhtar Sencer and Cem Atabeyoğlu, they were founded in their current permanent form in 1944. Fenerbahçe are one of the most successful clubs in Turkish basketball history, having won the EuroLeague as the first Turkish team, as well as 12 Turkish championships, 7 Turkish Cups, and 7 Turkish Super Cups, among others. They have also played in five consecutive EuroLeague Final Fours (2015, 2016, 2017, 2018, 2019) so far, a record in Turkish basketball.

European competitions
 European Championship
 Winners (1) (shared Turkish record): 2016–17

National Championships – 13
 Turkish Super League
 Winners (10): 1990–91, 2006–07, 2007–08, 2009–10, 2010–11, 2013–14, 2015–16, 2016–17, 2017–18, 2021–22
 Turkish Basketball Championship
 Winners (3): 1957, 1959, 1965

National Cups – 19
 Turkish Cup
 Winners (7): 1966–67, 2009–10, 2010–11, 2012–13, 2016, 2019, 2020

 Turkish Super Cup
 Winners (7): 1990, 1991, 1994, 2007, 2013, 2016, 2017

Turkish Federation Cup
 Winners (5): 1954, 1958, 1959, 1960, 1961

Fenerbahçe Women's Basketball 
In 1954, Fenerbahçe founded the first women's basketball team in Turkey. They became the most successful in Turkey, alongside archrivals Galatasaray, and achieved considerable success in European competitions. They became EuroLeague runners-up on three occasions, in the 2012–13, 2013–14, and 2016–17 seasons, and reached the third place twice in 2016 and 2021. The club also became fourth in the 2011–12 and 2014–15 seasons. Furthermore, Fenerbahçe became runners-up in the EuroCup in 2005. Overall, Fener played in four major European finals and managed to be among the best four European clubs seven times.

Domestically, Fenerbahçe won 18 Turkish championship titles (3 in the former Turkish Women's Basketball Championship and 15 in the Turkish Super League), 13 Turkish Cups, and 12 Turkish Super Cups (all of them records), among others.

National Championships – 19 (record)
 Turkish Super League
 Winners (16) (record): 1998–99, 2001–02, 2003–04, 2005–06, 2006–07, 2007–08, 2008–09, 2009–10, 2010–11, 2011–12, 2012–13, 2015–16, 2017–18, 2018–19, 2020–21, 2021–22
 Turkish Basketball Championship (1956–1980)
 Winners (3): 1956, 1957, 1958

National Cups – 25 (record)
 Turkish Cup
 Winners (13) (record): 1998–99, 1999–00, 2000–01, 2003–04, 2004–05, 2005–06, 2006–07, 2007–08, 2008–09, 2014–15, 2015–16, 2019, 2020
 Turkish Super Cup
 Winners (12) (record): 1999, 2000, 2001, 2004, 2005, 2007, 2010, 2012, 2013, 2014, 2015, 2019

Fenerbahçe Men's Volleyball 
Founded in 1927, they are one of the most successful volleyball teams in Turkey, having won five Turkish Volleyball League titles, four Turkish Cups and three Turkish Super Cups, among others. In Europe, Fenerbahçe have won two Balkan Cups and the CEV Challenge Cup in the 2013–14 season.

European competitions
 European Cup
 Winners (1) (shared Turkish record): 2013–14
 Balkan Cup
 Winners (2) (shared-record): 2009, 2013

National Championships – 5
 Turkish League
 Winners (5): 2007–08, 2009–10, 2010–11, 2011–12, 2018–19

National Cups – 10
 Turkish Cup
 Winners (4): 2007–08, 2011–12, 2016–17, 2018–19
 Turkish Super Cup
 Winners (4) (shared-record): 2011, 2012, 2017, 2020
 Turkish Federation Cup
 Winners (2): 1962, 1966

Fenerbahçe Women's Volleyball 

Founded in 1928 by Sabiha Gürayman who also became captain of the team, the women's volleyball department of Fenerbahçe was the first in Turkey and was closed the same year due to a lack of opponents. As a young woman, Sabiha Gürayman also played for the club's men's volleyball team, being the first female athlete to play in a men's team in Turkish sports history. Refounded in their current form in 1954, they became one of the best volleyball teams in Turkey and in the world. They were crowned World Champions by winning the FIVB Volleyball Women's Club World Championship undefeated in 2010, thus achieving the first Intercontinental Quadruple ever in Turkish volleyball history, after having won the Turkish League, Turkish Cup, and the Turkish Super Cup in 2010. Fenerbahçe became the first Turkish team to claim a World Championship title. After being runners-up in the European Champions League in 2010, Fenerbahçe were eventually crowned European Champions in the 2011–12 season after defeating French powerhouse RC Cannes in three straight sets (25–14, 25–22, and 25–20) in the final game. The club also reached the third place of the Champions League twice, in the 2010–11 and 2015–16 seasons.

Fenerbahçe also won the CEV Cup by defeating Russia's Uralochka-NTMK Ekaterinburg 3–0 (25-11, 28–26, 25-22) in the 2014 finals in front of their passionate home crowd, thus writing volleyball history as the men's team won another continental title, the CEV Challenge Cup, the very same day. By achieving this unparalleled feat, Fenerbahçe became the first and only sports club in Turkey and one of a few in Europe with European titles won in both the men's and women's volleyball departments.

Domestically, the club has won 13 Turkish Championships, 3 Turkish Cups and a record 3 Turkish Super Cups, among others.

International competitions
 World Championship
 Winners (1): 2010
 European Championship
 Winners (1): 2011–12
 European Cup
 Winners (1): 2013–14

National Championships – 13
 Turkish League
 Winners (5): 2008–09, 2009–10, 2010–11, 2014–15, 2016–17
 Turkish Volleyball Championship
 Winners (8): 1956, 1957, 1958, 1959, 1960, 1968, 1969, 1972

National Cups – 8
 Turkish Cup
 Winners (3): 2009–10, 2014–15, 2016–17
 Turkish Super Cup
 Winners (3): 2009, 2010, 2015
 Turkish Federation Cup
 Winners (2): 1960, 1977

Fenerbahçe Men's Table Tennis 

Founded in 1928, the table tennis department of Fenerbahçe became the most successful in Turkey. The men's team won the Turkish Super League 5 times, the Turkish Cup a record 11 times and the Istanbul Championship a record 23 times. They also reached the final of the ETTU Cup in 2008, which is the best result for any Turkish team so far.

 Turkish Championship
 Winners (5) (shared-record): 2006–07, 2007–08, 2008–09, 2015–16, 2018–19
 Turkish Cup
 Winners (11) (shared-record): 1964, 1968, 1970, 1972, 1979, 1983, 2005–06, 2006–07, 2008–09, 2011–12, 2014–15
 Istanbul Championship
 Winners (23) (record): 1930, 1948, 1949, 1950, 1951, 1952, 1953, 1962, 1963, 1964, 1965, 1968, 1969, 1970, 1973, 1978, 1979, 1981, 1982, 1983, 1984, 1985, 2002.

Fenerbahçe Women's Table Tennis 
The women's team is the most successful in Turkey and one of the most successful in Europe, having won the Turkish Championship a record 13 times, the Turkish Cup a record 14 times, the ETTU Cup 2 times in a row in 2012 and 2013, and the European Champions League as the first and only Turkish club in the 2014–15 season.

 European Championship
 Winners (1) (Turkish record): 2014–15

 European Cup
 Winners (2) (Turkish record): 2011–12, 2012–13

 Turkish Championship
 Winners (13) (record): 1998–99, 1999–00, 2000–01, 2001–02, 2007–08, 2009–10, 2010–11, 2011–12, 2012–13, 2013–14, 2014–15, 2015–16, 2018–19

 Turkish Cup
 Winners (14) (record): 1968, 1998–99, 1999–2000, 2000–01, 2001–02, 2006–07, 2007–08, 2008–09, 2010–11, 2011–12, 2012–13, 2013–14, 2014–15, 2018–19

 Istanbul Championship
 Winners (11): 1964, 1965, 1966, 1967, 1968, 1970, 1976, 1999, 2000, 2001, 2002.

Fenerbahçe Athletics 
Founded in 1918.

Fenerbahçe Boxing 
Founded in 1914.

Fenerbahçe Rowing 
Founded in 1914.

Fenerbahçe Sailing 
Founded in 1910.

Fenerbahçe Swimming 
Founded in 1913.

Fenerbahçe eSports 
Founded in 2016.

Facilities

Stadia 

The football team of Fenerbahçe play their home games at the Şükrü Saracoğlu Stadium (simply known as Kadıköy or Mabet  ("shrine" in Turkish) among supporters) in Kızıltoprak, Kadıköy, Istanbul. The stadium was opened in 1908 and most recently renovated between 1999 and 2006. Its seating capacity is 50,509. The stadium does not have a running track around the pitch, which is unusual for a typical Turkish stadium.

The Ülker Sports Arena is a multi-purpose indoor arena in Ataşehir, Istanbul, with a capacity of 13,800 seats. The arena completed and opened in January 2012 after over two years of construction. Fenerbahçe's basketball team play their home games at the Ülker Sports Arena.

Training facilities 
The Can Bartu Training Facilities are a training complex located in Samandıra, Sancaktepe, Istanbul. The construction for this training complex began in 1997 during former president Ali Şen's presidency. The construction was completed in 2000. The football department of Fenerbahçe use the facilities.

The Lefter Küçükandonyadis Training Facilities are a large complex located at Dereağzı, Kadıköy, Istanbul. Re-opened in 1989 and renovated in 1998. Fenerbahçe's A2, U18, U17, U16, U15, and U14 teams play their home games in the complex. The facilities also serve the basketball, volleyball, athletics, boxing, rowing, and sailing departments.

The Topuk Yaylası Facilities are a training complex near a forest and a lake, located in the Topuk Plateau in Kaynaşlı, Düzce Province. The construction began in 2010 and was completed in 2011. All departments of the club use the complex for their pre-season trainings.

The Türk Telekom Ankara Facilities are a complex located in İncek in the suburbs of Ankara. The complex hosts Fenerbahçe's all departments that visit Ankara or a nearby locality for their games as well as other clubs.

The Samim Göreç Basketball Hall is a basketball hall with a training facility, located in the Lefter Küçükandonyadis Training Facilities in Dereağzı. First opened in 1982 and refurbished on 24 February 2001. The men's basketball and women's basketball departments of Fenerbahçe use the hall and the training facility for their trainings.

The Muhtar Sencer Volleyball Hall is a volleyball hall located in the Lefter Küçükandonyadis Training Facilities in Dereağzı. Fenerbahçe's men's volleyball and women's volleyball teams use the hall for their trainings.

The Vefa Küçük Swimming Pool is a semi-Olympic-sized swimming pool on the Fenerbahçe Isle. The pool was built by the former vice president Vefa Küçük and opened on 16 July 1999, and serves the swimming department.
There is also an Olympic-sized swimming pool located on the Fenerbahçe Isle, which was opened in 2004. The pool is also used by the swimming department of the club.

The Fikirtepe Facilities are located in Fikirtepe, Kadıköy. They opened on 1 July 1998 and serve the development of the youth football departments.

Fenerbahçe Museum 
The Fenerbahçe Museum (Turkish: Fenerbahçe Müzesi) is devoted to the history of the club. Founded in 1908 by Ali Rıza Bey, the museum is housed in the Şükrü Saracoğlu Stadium. Many of the trophies won by the club are on display there. There are 426 trophies on exhibition out of approximately 3.000 trophies won.

Other facilities 
The club's headquarters were initially located on the Fenerbahçe Isle near to the stadium. In 2006, the headquarters moved into the stadium to gather all the sections under one roof.

The Faruk Ilgaz Social Facilities are a social complex with an indoor hall, a restaurant, a patisserie, and an olympic swimming pool, located next to the club's headquarters. They were initially opened on 15 May 1969 but rebuilt during the presidency of former president Aziz Yıldırım as a modern complex and re-opened on 21 January 2004.

The Fenerbahçe Guesthouse is an inn with a capacity of 60 guests. The inn also hosts new transfers. The Todori Facility is a restaurant owned and operated by the club, located in Kalamış, Kadıköy. The Entertainment and Recreation Center is located in the Faruk Ilgaz Social Facilities. The swimming pool is located in the Lefter Küçükandonyadis Training Facilities and hosts the club members and their families.

Media

Fenerbahçe TV 

Fenerbahçe TV (FB TV) is the first television channel of a sports club in Turkey. The channel launched in 2004 over satellite (Free-To-Air on Turksat 3A located 42° East, 11957 V 27500 5/6), D-Smart 82. Canal satellite network services and cable service.

Fenerbahçe Radio 

Fenerbahçe Radyo (FB Radyo) is a nationwide FM radio network broadcasting from Istanbul. It is the first sports club radio station in Turkey. Broadcasting Pop Music in Turkish and other languages, FB Radyo can be listened to via terrestrial broadcast, Free-To-Air on Turksat 3A Satellite (located 42° East, 11804 V 24444 5/6, VPID: 516, APID:690, SPID:5), BlackBerry and iPhone applications.

Fenerium 

Fenerium is the club's own company which markets licensed products and sponsors some of the club's departments and teams. The company was established in 2000.
The headquarter is located in the Şükrü Saracoğlu Stadium in Istanbul.

Fenerium has 96 stores in total. 46 are based in Istanbul, 8 in Ankara, 4 in İzmir, 3 in Antalya, 2 in Adana, Aydın, Gaziantep, Hatay, Konya, Muğla, Sakarya, and Samsun. The other stores are located in Bursa, Çanakkale, Denizli, Diyarbakır, Düzce, Elazığ, Kahramanmaraş, Kayseri, Kocaeli, Malatya, Manisa, Mersin, Şanlıurfa, and Tekirdağ. There are two stores serving abroad, one of them is located in Northern Cyprus (North Nicosia Fenerium) and the other one in the Netherlands (Rotterdam Fenerium).

Supporters

Club officials 

Source:

Presidential history

Sponsorship 
Companies that Fenerbahçe SK currently have sponsorship deals with:

Trivia 
A genus of African fish has been named in honor of the club by a group of Turkish biologists.

Notes

References 

Sources

External links

 Official website of Fenerbahçe SK 
 Official website of 1907 Fenerbahçe Association 

 
Sports clubs established in 1907
Sport in Kadıköy
1907 establishments in the Ottoman Empire